In a Different Light is the tenth studio album released by American country music artist Doug Stone. It was his first album for Lofton Creek Records. Two re-recordings of his older songs are included here: "In a Different Light" (originally on his 1990 album Doug Stone) and "Why Didn't I Think of That" (originally on his 1992 album From the Heart). Also included are four covers: "Georgia on My Mind" (the official state song for the state of Georgia), and "Only You (And You Alone)" (originally recorded by The Platters). and Crazy Love (originally recorded by Van Morrison) and tell it like it is (originally recorded by Aaron Neville)

Track listing
"Georgia on My Mind" (Stuart Gorrell, Hoagy Carmichael) – 4:03
"Time" (Steve Nelson, Suzanna Spring) – 3:40
"World Goes Round" (Brian Beathard, Jimmy Devine) – 2:50
"How Do I Get Off the Moon" (Randy Boudreaux, Donny Kees, Kerry Kurt Phillips) – 3:56
"Only You (And You Alone)" (Buck Ram, Ande Rand) – 3:16
"The Beginning of the End" (Jeff Jones, Rusty VanSickle) – 3:38
"Crazy Love" (Van Morrison) – 3:05
"Everything" (J. Jones, VanSickle, Terry Clayton) – 3:52
"To Be a Man" (Jeff Dayton, VanSickle) – 3:46
"Let the Light Shine on You" (Boudreaux, Blake Mevis) – 3:03
"Millionaire" (Devine) – 3:09
"Tell It Like It Is" (George Davis, Lee Diamond) – 3:40
"In a Different Light" (Bucky Jones, Dickey Lee, Bob McDill) – 3:39
"Why Didn't I Think of That" (Paul Harrison, McDill) – 3:12

Personnel
 Bobby All - acoustic guitar
 Jeff Brock - background vocals
 Wesley Buttrey - percussion
 Mike Chapman - bass guitar
 David Davidson - fiddle, violin
 Barry Green - tenor trombone
 Owen Hale - drums
 Mike Haynes - trumpet
 Curtis Jay - bass guitar, Hammond organ
 Mike Johnson - steel guitar
 Jerry Kimbrough - 12-string guitar, acoustic guitar, electric guitar, gut string guitar
 Sam Levine - tenor saxophone, clarinet
 Derek Mixon - drums
 Russ Pahl - banjo, dobro, steel guitar
 Matt Rawlins - piano
 Dan Shough - acoustic guitar, electric guitar
 Rusty Van Sickle - background vocals
 Gary Smith - clavinet, Hammond organ, piano, electric piano, synthesizer
 Joe Spivey - fiddle
 Doug Stone - lead vocals
 Kerry West - acoustic guitar, electric guitar
 Curtis Wright - background vocals
 Jonathan Yudkin - fiddle, mandolin, tambur, viola, violin
 Lisa Zanghi - background vocals

External links
[ In a Different Light] at Allmusic

2005 albums
Lofton Creek Records albums
Doug Stone albums